Adolf Hugo Magnusson (1 March 188514 July 1964) was a Swedish naturalist who specialized in lichenology. He was a school teacher in Gothenburg from 1909 to 1948, but spent his spare time on the study of lichens. He described about 900 new taxa, specializing in the genera Lecidea, Lecanora, Caloplaca, and Acarospora.

Life and career
Magnusson began studying botany at Uppsala University in 1904, but was forced to cancel his studies for financial reasons after only a year and instead became educated as a primary school teacher. In 1909 he was enrolled at the University of Gothenburg, where he graduated with a bachelor's degree in philosophy in 1913 and a philosophy degree in 1914. He worked as a schoolteacher until his retirement.

Magnusson became an internationally renowned lichenologist who described about 900 species in about 150 scientific publications. He studied all kinds of lichens, but was particularly interested in crustose lichens such as Acarospora, Caloplaca, Lecanora, Lecidea, and Rinodina. Magnusson identified more than 900 lichen specimens collected by Finnish amateur botanist  during the Yenisey river expedition in 1876.

Among Magnusson's publications is a monograph on the lichens in Hawaii, and a review of the lichens collected by Sven Hedin in Central Asia. He became an honorary doctor of philosophy at Uppsala University in 1932 and a member of the Royal Swedish Academy of Sciences in Gothenburg in 1956. Magnusson's collections, numbering around 70,000 specimens, are kept at Uppsala University.

Eponymy
Magnusson has had several lichen taxa named in his honour. These include: Magnussoniolichen  Magnussoniomyces , Acarospora magnussonii , Caloplaca magni-filii , C. magnussoniana , C. magnussonii , Cetraria magnussonii , Cladonia magnussonii , Dermatocarpon magnussonii , Involucrothele magnussonii , Lecanora magnussoniana , L. magnussonii , Lecidea magnussonii , Leptogium magnussonii , Physcia magnussonii , Polyblastia magnussoniana , Rinodina magnussoniana , Rinodina magnussonii , Sarcogyne magnussonii , Squamarina magnussonii , Thelocarpon magnussonii , Umbilicaria magnussonii , and Verrucaria magnussoniana .

See also
 :Category:Taxa named by Adolf Hugo Magnusson

References

1885 births
1964 deaths
Members of the Royal Swedish Academy of Sciences
People from Uppland
Swedish naturalists
Swedish lichenologists
Uppsala University alumni
University of Gothenburg alumni
Swedish taxonomists
20th-century naturalists